The Church and convent of San Agustín is a Catholic temple located in the Historic Center of the city of Quito, run by the Augustinian Order. The complex of the temple and convent is located on calle Chile, between Guayaquil and Flores.

Building
The site was assigned to the Augustinian order in 1573, when they began construction of the convent, although the church would only be built between 1606 and 1617 by Juan del Corral, based on the plans designed by the architect Francisco Becerra in 1581, who also worked on the design of the Church of Santo Domingo.

Details of the main portal reveal the Neoclassical style printed by Diego de Escarza, in which Spanish and Amerindian decorative elements stand out. The bell tower reaches a height of 37 meters and inside it the same bells placed there in the 17th century.

The convent built in the 16th century, which has a separate entrance on the eastern side of the façade, forms a single architectural complex together with the temple and a small atrium with a stone cross on the corner diametrically opposite the latter's entrance. The cloister was completed in the middle of the 17th century. Inside the cloisters there are gardens and a large session hall called the Chapter House, which was only conceived in the 18th century, and where the Act of the Governing Board of 1809 was signed and there the first cry of freedom was given.

Art pieces 

On its main altar hangs an enormous painting, the work of Miguel de Santiago, in the 17th century, called "The Triumph of Saint Augustine".

Gallery

See also
List of buildings in Quito

References

Roman Catholic churches completed in 1617
16th-century Roman Catholic church buildings in Ecuador
Baroque church buildings in Ecuador
Roman Catholic churches in Quito
Spanish Baroque architecture